These are the rosters to the 1972 UEFA European Football Championship, which was in Belgium, from 14 June to 18 June 1972. The players' listed ages is their age on the tournament's opening day (14 June 1972).

The tournament squads were remarkable in that every player in the tournament played for a club in his native country.

Belgium
Manager: Raymond Goethals

Hungary
Manager: Rudolf Illovszky

Soviet Union
Manager: Aleksandr Ponomarev

West Germany
Manager: Helmut Schön

External links
RSSSF
 weltfussball.de 

1972
Squads